Huỳnh Kesley Alves or Kesley Alves (born 23 December 1981) is a Vietnamese-Brazilian football striker who currently plays for Vietnamese club Becamex Bình Dương.

In 2005, he came to Vietnam and signed for Becamex Bình Dương from Matsubara in 2005 and became one of the greatest foreigners in the V-League. He gained Vietnamese citizenship in 2009 and earned one cap with Vietnam national football team.

Alves announced his retirement in 2019. He became the assistant manager of Becamex Bình Dương in 2021, before he was registered in the club’s squad list for the second part of the season during the 2022 season, making his comeback from retirement.

Honours

Club
Becamex Bình Dương
V.League 1 (3): 2007, 2008, 2014  
Vietnamese Super Cup (2): 2007, 2008
Sài Gòn Xuân Thành
V.League 2 (1): 2011
Vietnamese National Cup (1): 2012

Individual
 Best foreign player of V-League 2005 
 Top goal-scorer of V-League 2005 
 Top goal-scorer of 2009 AFC Cup
 Golden Boot Award 2009

References

External links

1979 births
Living people
Association football forwards
Brazilian footballers
Sportspeople from Bahia
Brazilian emigrants to Vietnam
Naturalized citizens of Vietnam
Vietnam international footballers
Vietnamese footballers
Brazilian expatriate footballers
Brazilian expatriate sportspeople in Thailand
Expatriate footballers in Thailand
Xuan Thanh Saigon Cement FC players
Hoang Anh Gia Lai FC players
Becamex Binh Duong FC players
Dong Nai FC players
V.League 1 players